Philip Douglas Roberts (1919–1976) was a South Australian painter and art critic.

History
Roberts was born in Kadina, South Australia, the youngest son of Albert John Roberts (ca.1874 – 3 September 1944) and Sarah Roberts, née Behrmann.

Educated at Kadina, he was a keen cricketer, and at one time held the batting record for the Yorke Peninsula league. He trained as a teacher and was first appointed to the Thebarton Junior Technical School in 1938.

He was a regular art critic for both South Australia daily newspapers and the Sunday Mail.

He was a foundation member of the South Australian branch of the Contemporary Art Society

He was a senior lecturer at the South Australian School of Arts, then acting principal 1957–1958 and principal 1964– .

Selected works
Portrait of Reginald A. West, former principal of Adelaide High School, held by the school.
The Art Gallery of South Australia holds some fourteen of his paintings.

Family
He married Vera Piggott Southwell, née Southwell (1922–2009) on 22 March 1947. Vera's first husband, Peter Morphett Piggott (12 November 1920 – 30 December 1941) died while serving with RAAF in England.

References 

Australian painters
Australian art teachers
1919 births
1976 deaths